Cathedral of Our Lady of Perpetual Help may refer to:

 Cathedral of Our Lady of Perpetual Succour, Prizren, Kosovo
Cathedral of Our Lady of Perpetual Help (Rapid City, South Dakota), US
Cathedral of Our Lady of Perpetual Help (Oklahoma City), US

See also
Our Lady of Perpetual Help Church (disambiguation)